NCEL may refer to:

North Carolina Education Lottery
Northern Counties East League